Damase Pierre-Louis  (1894–1945) was a Haitian historian, statesman, author, journalist and diplomat.

Pierre-Louis was born in Borgne, northern Haiti. He worked as a teacher of English at the prestigious Collège Notre-Dame du Perpetuel Secours in Cap-Haitian, Haiti.  He earned a law degree and was a lawyer as well.  He also was a journalist and a diplomat, serving as the ambassador to France. He is best known for his political writing.  He was candidate to senate for the department of North, Haiti in 1933.  He died in prison in 1945.

Selected works 

 Le President Borno et la Liberation du territoire (1924)
 Les mensonges de notre democratie (1933)
 Pouvoir et Politique (1934)

References 

 Schutt-Ainé, Patricia; Staff of Librairie Au Service de la Culture (1994). Haiti: A Basic Reference Book. Miami, Florida: Librairie Au Service de la Culture. p. 103. .
 Delince, Kern ; Quelle armee pour Haiti?: Militarisme et democratie, Publisher: Pegasus Books (distributor) (1994), 

1894 births
1945 deaths
20th-century Haitian historians
Haitian male writers
20th-century male writers
People from Nord (Haitian department)
Haitian diplomats
Ambassadors of Haiti to France
Haitian people who died in prison custody
Prisoners who died in Haitian detention